Gli amori di Zelinda e Lindoro is a comedy play by Venetian playwright Carlo Goldoni. It was published in 1763.

Plays by Carlo Goldoni
1763 plays